Algerian Americans are Americans who are of Algerian descent or Algerians who have American citizenship. According to the 2000 United States Census, there are over 8,000 Americans of Algerian descent.

After Algeria's war of independence, which ended in 1962, many Algerian students immigrated to the US to enroll in universities. Other Algerians, including scientists and doctors, also immigrated to the US to live there permanently. In the 1990s many Algerians were persecuted in their homeland for their political views which, together with the lack of jobs there, forced many of them to emigrate. However, the European Union limited the number of North Africans who could immigrate to its member countries, which diverted most of the Algerian immigration to the US, which had increased the number of work visas for people from North Africa.

Algerian communities are established in major cities such as New York, Washington, D.C., Los Angeles and Chicago. Algerians in Chicago commemorate the anniversary of the start of the war between Algeria and France that led to their country's independence every November 1.

See also 

North Africans in the United States
Arab Americans
Algeria–United States relations

References 

American people of Algerian descent
Arab American
 
Multiracial ethnic groups in the United States
North Africans in the United States